Akhurst is a surname. Notable people with the surname include:

Carl Akhurst (1886–1953), Australian politician
Daphne Akhurst (1903–1933), Australian tennis player
Lucy Akhurst (born 1975), British actress
William Akhurst (1822–1878), Australian actor

See also
Akehurst
Wakehurst